Bauhinia is a large genus of flowering plants in the subfamily Cercidoideae and tribe Bauhinieae, in the large flowering plant family Fabaceae, with a pantropical distribution. The genus was named after the Bauhin brothers Gaspard and Johann, Swiss-French botanists.

Many species are widely planted in the tropics as orchid trees, particularly in India, Sri Lanka, Vietnam, Nepal and southeastern China. Other common names include mountain ebony and kachnar.  Before the family was reorganised, a number of genera including the lianas of genus Phanera were placed here (see related genera).
In the United States, the trees grow in Hawaii, coastal California, Arizona, Texas, Louisiana, and Florida. There are native species, like Bauhinia lunarioides native to Texas and widely planted in the Southwest as a landscape plant.  

Bauhinia × blakeana is the floral emblem of Hong Kong—a stylized orchid tree flower appears on the flag of Hong Kong and Hong Kong Airlines uses 'Bauhinia' as its radio callsign in air traffic communication.

Description
Bauhinia trees typically reach a height of 6–12 m and their branches spread 3–6 m outwards. The lobed leaves usually are 10–15 cm across.

The five-petaled flowers are 7.5–12.5 cm diameter, generally in shades of red, pink, purple, orange, or yellow, and are often fragrant. The tree begins flowering in late winter and often continues to flower into early summer. Depending on the species, Bauhinia flowers are usually in magenta, mauve, pink or white hues with crimson highlights.

Cultivation
Propagation of Bauhinia species is from seeds or cuttings. They thrive in alkaline soils and do not tolerate salty conditions. Full sun exposure is preferred but they can be grown under partial sun. Generous watering is needed during summer; moderate moisture required in winter.

Species

Accepted species
Plants of the World Online currently (March 2023) includes the following species:

 Bauhinia acreana Harms
 Bauhinia aculeata L.
 Bauhinia acuminata L.
 Bauhinia acuruana Moric.
 Bauhinia affinis Vogel
 Bauhinia albicans Vogel
 Bauhinia amambayensis Fortunato
 Bauhinia amatlana Wunderlin
 Bauhinia andrieuxii Hemsl.
 Bauhinia ankarafantsikae Du Puy & R.Rabev.
 Bauhinia anomala Hassl.
 Bauhinia arborea Wunderlin
 Bauhinia argentinensis Burkart
 Bauhinia augusti Harms
 Bauhinia aurantiaca Bojer
 Bauhinia aureopunctata Ducke
 Bauhinia ayabacensis Wunderlin
 Bauhinia bartlettii B.L.Turner
 Bauhinia bauhinioides (Mart.) J.F.Macbr.
 Bauhinia beguinotii Cufod.
 Bauhinia bicolor (Bong.) D.Dietr.
 Bauhinia bohniana H.Y.Chen
 Bauhinia bombaciflora Ducke
 Bauhinia bowkeri Harv.
 Bauhinia brachycalyx Ducke
 Bauhinia brachycarpa Wall. ex Benth.
 Bauhinia brevicalyx Du Puy & R.Rabev.
 Bauhinia brevipes Vogel
 Bauhinia bryoniflora Franch.
 Bauhinia burchellii Benth.
 Bauhinia burrowsii E.J.D.Schmidt
 Bauhinia buscalionii Mattei
 Bauhinia calliandroides Rusby
 Bauhinia caloneura Malme
 Bauhinia calycina Pierre ex Gagnep.
 Bauhinia campestris Malme
 Bauhinia candelabriformis R.S.Cowan
 Bauhinia capuronii Du Puy & R.Rabev.
 Bauhinia catingae Harms
 Bauhinia chapulhuacania Wunderlin
 Bauhinia cheilantha (Bong.) Steud.
 Bauhinia cinnamomea DC.
 Bauhinia coclensis R.Torres
 Bauhinia conceptionis Britton & Killip
 Bauhinia concinna Drake
 Bauhinia conwayi Rusby
 Bauhinia cookii Rose
 Bauhinia corifolia L.P.Queiroz
 Bauhinia corniculata Benth.
 Bauhinia coulteri J.F.Macbr.
 Bauhinia crocea Drake
 Bauhinia cupulata Benth.
 Bauhinia curvula Benth.
 Bauhinia darainensis Thulin & Nusb.
 Bauhinia decandra Du Puy & R.Rabev.
 Bauhinia decora L.Uribe
 Bauhinia deserti (Britton & Rose) Lundell
 Bauhinia dimorphophylla Hoehne
 Bauhinia dipetala Hemsl.
 Bauhinia diptera Blume ex Miq.
 Bauhinia divaricata L.
 Bauhinia dubia G.Don
 Bauhinia dumosa Benth.
 Bauhinia eilertsii Pulle
 Bauhinia ellenbeckii Harms
 Bauhinia erythrocalyx Wunderlin
 Bauhinia esmeraldasensis Wunderlin
 Bauhinia estrellensis Hassl.
 Bauhinia eucosma S.F.Blake
 Bauhinia euryantha H.Y.Chen
 Bauhinia exellii Torre & Hillc.
 Bauhinia eximia Miq.
 Bauhinia farec Desv.
 Bauhinia flagelliflora Wunderlin
 Bauhinia floribunda Desv.
 Bauhinia forficata Link
 Bauhinia fryxellii Wunderlin
 Bauhinia funchiana Vaz & G.P.Lewis
 Bauhinia fusconervis (Bong.) Steud.
 Bauhinia galpinii N.E.Br.
 Bauhinia gardneri Benth.
 Bauhinia geniculata Wunderlin
 Bauhinia gilesii F.Muell. & F.M.Bailey
 Bauhinia glaziovii Taub.
 Bauhinia godefroyi Gagnep.
 Bauhinia goyazensis Harms
 Bauhinia grandidieri Baill.
 Bauhinia grandifolia (Bong.) D.Dietr.
 Bauhinia grevei Drake
 Bauhinia gypsicola McVaugh
 Bauhinia hagenbeckii Harms
 Bauhinia hainanensis Merr. & Chun ex H.Y.Chen
 Bauhinia haughtii Wunderlin
 Bauhinia hildebrandtii Vatke
 Bauhinia hirsuta Weinm.
 Bauhinia holophylla (Bong.) Steud.
 Bauhinia hostmanniana Miq.
 Bauhinia humilis Rusby
 Bauhinia integerrima Mart. ex Benth.
 Bauhinia involucrans Gagnep.
 Bauhinia isopetala Griff.
 Bauhinia jenningsii P.Wilson
 Bauhinia jucunda Brandegee
 Bauhinia kalantha Harms
 Bauhinia kleiniana Burkart
 Bauhinia leptantha Malme
 Bauhinia leucantha Thulin
 Bauhinia longicuspis Spruce ex Benth.
 Bauhinia longifolia (Bong.) Steud.
 Bauhinia longipedicellata Ducke
 Bauhinia longiracemosa Hayata
 Bauhinia lorantha Pierre ex Gagnep.
 Bauhinia lunarioides A.Gray ex S.Watson
 Bauhinia macrantha Oliv.
 Bauhinia macranthera Benth. ex Hemsl.
 Bauhinia madagascariensis Desv.
 Bauhinia malacotricha Harms
 Bauhinia malacotrichoides R.S.Cowan
 Bauhinia malmeana Vaz & G.P.Lewis
 Bauhinia marginata (Bong.) Steud.
 Bauhinia megacarpa H.Y.Chen
 Bauhinia melastomatoidea R.Torres
 Bauhinia membranacea Benth.
 Bauhinia mendoncae Torre & Hillc.
 Bauhinia miriamae R.Torres
 Bauhinia mollis (Bong.) D.Dietr.
 Bauhinia mombassae Vatke
 Bauhinia monandra Kurz
 Bauhinia moningerae Merr.
 Bauhinia morondavensis Du Puy & R.Rabev.
 Bauhinia multinervia (Kunth) DC.
 Bauhinia natalensis Oliv.
 Bauhinia ombrophila Du Puy & R.Rabev.
 Bauhinia ovata (Bong.) Vogel
 Bauhinia oxysepala Gagnep.
 Bauhinia pansamalana Donn.Sm.
 Bauhinia parkinsonii C.E.C.Fisch.
 Bauhinia parviloba Ducke
 Bauhinia pauletia Pers.
 Bauhinia pentandra (Bong.) Vogel ex D.Dietr.
 Bauhinia pervilleana Baill.
 Bauhinia pes-caprae Cav.
 Bauhinia petersiana Bolle
 Bauhinia petiolata (Mutis ex DC.) Triana ex Hook.
 Bauhinia phoenicea B.Heyne ex Wight & Arn.
 Bauhinia pichinchensis Wunderlin
 Bauhinia picta (Kunth) DC.
 Bauhinia pinheiroi Wunderlin
 Bauhinia pinnata Blanco
 Bauhinia piresii Vaz & G.P.Lewis
 Bauhinia platypetala Burch. ex Benth.
 Bauhinia platyphylla Benth.
 Bauhinia podopetala Baker
 Bauhinia pottsii G.Don
 Bauhinia prainiana Craib
 Bauhinia pringlei S.Watson
 Bauhinia proboscidea P.Juárez, Rod.Flores & M.A.Blanco
 Bauhinia pulchella Benth.
 Bauhinia purpurea L.
 Bauhinia racemosa Lam.
 Bauhinia ramirezii Reynoso
 Bauhinia ramosissima Benth. ex Hemsl.
 Bauhinia retifolia Standl.
 Bauhinia richardiana DC.
 Bauhinia rubeleruziana Donn.Sm.
 Bauhinia rufa (Bong.) Steud.
 Bauhinia rufescens Lam.
 Bauhinia saccocalyx Pierre
 Bauhinia saksuwaniae Mattapha, Chantar. & Suddee
 Bauhinia seleriana Harms
 Bauhinia seminarioi Harms ex Eggers
 Bauhinia smilacifolia Burch. ex Benth.
 Bauhinia stenantha Diels
 Bauhinia subclavata Benth.
 Bauhinia subrotundifolia Cav.
 Bauhinia taitensis Taub.
 Bauhinia tarapotensis Benth.
 Bauhinia tenella Benth.
 Bauhinia thailandica Chatan & Promprom
 Bauhinia thompsonii I.M.Johnst.
 Bauhinia tomentosa L.
 Bauhinia tuichiensis Cayola & A.Fuentes
 Bauhinia uberlandiana Vaz & G.P.Lewis
 Bauhinia ungulata L.
 Bauhinia urbaniana Schinz
 Bauhinia uruguayensis Benth.
 Bauhinia variegata L.
 Bauhinia vespertilio S.Moore
 Bauhinia viridescens Desv.
 Bauhinia weberbaueri Harms
 Bauhinia wunderlinii R.Torres
 Bauhinia xerophyta Du Puy & R.Rabev.

Hybrids
One hybrid is known:
 Bauhinia × blakeana S. T. Dunn (Bauhinia variegata × Bauhinia purpurea)—Hong Kong orchid tree

Fossils
Several fossils of Bauhinia species have been discovered:
 †Bauhinia cheniae Qi Wang, Z. Q. Song, Y. F. Chen, S. Shen & Z. Y. Li
 †Bauhinia cretacea Newberry
 †Bauhinia fotana F.M.B. Jacques et al.
 †Bauhinia gigantea Newberry
 †Bauhinia gracilis J.R. Tao
 †Bauhinia larsenii D.X. Zhang & Y. F. Chen
 †Bauhinia ningmingensis Qi Wang, Z. Q. Song, Y. F. Chen, S. Shen & Z. Y. Li
 †Bauhinia potosiana Berry
 †Bauhinia thonningii Schum.
 †Bauhinia ungulatoides Y.X.Lin, W.O.Wong, G.L.Shi, S.Shen & Z.Y.Li
 †Bauhinia wenshanensis H.H. Meng & Z.K. Zhou
 †Bauhinia wyomingiana Brown

Segregated genera
Species in the genera Barklya, Gigasiphon, Lysiphyllum, Phanera (including Lasiobema), Piliostigma, Schnella, and Tylosema are sometimes included in Bauhinia sensu lato or considered as tribe Bauhinieae.

References

External links

 
Taxa named by Carl Linnaeus
Pantropical flora
Fabaceae genera